Vladimir Terebilov (5 March 1916 – 3 May 2004) was a Soviet judge and politician, who served as justice minister for slightly less than fourteen years from 1970 to 1984.

Early life and education
Terebilov was born in Petrograd on 5 March 1916. He graduated from the Leningrad Institute of Law in 1939.

Career
Terebilov worked as the head of the military collegium archives. He was also a member of the central committee of the Communist Party He also served in the Supreme Soviet as a deputy of the Uzbek Soviet Socialist Republic.

Just before his appointment as justice minister, he acted as one of the deputy chairmen of the Soviet supreme court. He served as justice minister from 1 September 1970 to 12 April 1984. Boris Kravtsov succeeded him as justice minister. Then Terebilov was appointed chairman of the Soviet supreme court on 23 April 1984. Terebilov replaced Lev Smirnov in the post, who had been holding the post for twelve years. Terebilov allegedly "cleaned" the archives of the court during his tenure. He retired on 12 April 1989. However, Terebilov was made a member of the advisory committee formed at justice ministry in 1998.

Work and death
Terebilov is the author of a book entitled The Soviet court (1986). He died on 3 May 2004.

References

External links

20th-century jurists
1916 births
2004 deaths
Central Committee of the Communist Party of the Soviet Union members
Lawyers from Saint Petersburg
Soviet Ministers of Justice
Soviet jurists